Pranavananda Vidyamandir is a school located in Chaitanya Avenue, Durgapur, West Bengal, India. Pranavananda Vidyamandir is a Co-educational Day School affiliated to the Council for the Indian School Certificate Examinations (CISCE). The school was founded by Bharat Sevashram Sangha. The first batch of students passed the ICSE 10th standard examination in 1987.

References 

http://yellowpages.sulekha.com/school-finder/west-bengal/burdwan/schools/durgapur-steel-town-east/pranavananda-vidya-mandir.htm

External links 
 Wikimapia

Schools affiliated with the Bharat Sevashram Sangha
High schools and secondary schools in West Bengal
Schools in Paschim Bardhaman district
Education in Durgapur, West Bengal
Educational institutions established in the 1980s
1980s establishments in West Bengal